Pemeso is a farming community in the Prestea-Huni Valley district, a district in the Western Region of Ghana. The community has a river known as the Peme river which flows from Pemeso into Mansi.

References 

Western Region (Ghana)
Communities in Ghana